De Stefani is an Italian surname. Notable people with the surname include:

 Albert Louis "Jocko" Destefani (1920-1981)  Farmer, Business Man
Alberto De Stefani (1879–1969), Italian politician
Alessandro De Stefani (1891–1970), Italian screenwriter
Giorgio de Stefani (1904–1992), Italian tennis player
Joseph De Stefani (1879–1940), American actor
Theodosio De Stefani Perez (1853–1935), Italian scientist
Tommaso de Stefani (c. 1250– c. 1310), Italian painter

Italian-language surnames